Anita Otto (née Hentschel, 12 December 1942 – 18 April 2019) was a German discus thrower. Representing East Germany, she won bronze in women's discus at the 1966 European Athletics Championships and placed fourth at the 1968 Summer Olympics.

Career
Otto was East German champion in 1965 (56.20 m) and 1966 (57.84 m), both of her winning marks being new meeting records. At the 1966 European Championships in Budapest she placed third behind her teammate Christine Spielberg and West Germany's Liesel Westermann with a throw of 56.80 m.

Otto placed fourth at the 1968 Summer Olympics in Mexico City, only throwing 54.40 m in rainy conditions and missing out on a medal by half a metre.

Czechoslovakian sports statistician Jan Popper ranked Otto in the world's top five in women's discus throw every year from 1965 to 1968, and ninth in the world in 1969.

References

1942 births
Living people
German female discus throwers
East German female discus throwers
Athletes (track and field) at the 1968 Summer Olympics
Olympic athletes of East Germany
European Athletics Championships medalists